Dr. Kimberly A. Weaver (born April 19, 1964 in Morgantown, West Virginia) is an American astrophysics astronomer and professor. She has worked with NASA on several research projects. She is often seen on television programs about astronomy. She is an expert in the area of x-ray astronomy.

Early life and education
As a five-year-old girl she was impressed by pictures of planets and galaxies as well as the 300 foot antenna dish of the National Radio Astronomy Observatory in Green Bank, West Virginia. She also credits the Apollo 11 lunar mission as the inspiration to become a career scientist at NASA.

She attended West Virginia University and completed a B.S.degree in physics in 1987. She then enrolled at the University of Maryland in 1988, where she began working as a student intern at NASA's Goddard Space Flight Center in Greenbelt, Maryland. Kim graduated from the University of Maryland in 1990 with M.S. in Astronomy. She was accepted to the University of Maryland at College Park and graduated in 1993 with Ph.D. in astronomy. Her doctoral thesis was in complex broad-band x-ray spectra of Seyfert Galaxies. Weaver spent an additional two years as a postdoctoral research associate at Penn State and another two years as an associate research scientist at Johns Hopkins University. In 1998, she returned to Goddard.

Career
At Goddard's Laboratory for High Energy Astrophysics, Weaver was a civil servant scientist, focusing on x-ray astronomy, particularly the Constellation X satellite project, which is part of NASA's "Beyond Einstein" program, as the Deputy Project Scientist. During her tenure at Goddard, she also worked extensively with the Chandra X-ray Observatory where many important observations were made with respect to starburst galaxies, black holes and other astronomical phenomena. In addition to Chandra, Weaver has worked with other x-ray telescopes such as the XXM-Newton, RXTE, and the BeppoSAX, satellites. In 2005 she was on special assignment to the California Institute of Technology as the Spitzer Program Scientist for NASA.  Weaver works now at NASA's Goddard Space Flight Center in Greenbelt, Maryland, as an Astrophysicist in the X-Ray astrophysics lab. Currently Weaver, in addition to working with NASA, is also an adjunct professor at Johns Hopkins University in Baltimore, Maryland.

Weaver's areas of research interest include General X-Ray Astronomy, Active Galactic Nuclei, Starburst Galaxies, and Black Hole formation. She is involved with many professional groups and organizations, including: the American Astronomical Society's Executive Committee of the High Energy Astrophysics Division and Committee for the Status of Women in Astronomy; the International Astronomical Union; the American Physical Society; and the Goddard Employees Welfare Association.

Awards
Weaver has received many awards including:
 2011, West Virginia University Academy of Distinguished Alumni
 2009, Robert H. Goddard Exceptional Achievement Award in Outreach
 2009, Distinguished Alumna Award, University of Maryland Astronomy Department
 2007, West Virginia University Alumni Recognition Award
 1996, Presidential Early Career Award for Scientists and Engineers, NASA
 1991-1993, NASA Graduate Student Researcher's Fellowship
 1992, NASA Peer Award

Publications
Weaver has been published in over 60 scientific journals, including:

 "On the Evidence of Extreme Gravity Effects in MCG-6-30-15", Weaver,K.A., and Yaqoob, T. 1998, ApJ, 502, L139
 "An X-Ray Minisurvey of Nearby Edge-On Starburst Galaxies. II. The Question of Metal Abundance.", Weaver, K.A., Heckman, T.M., Dahlem, M. 2000 ApJ 534, 684

She is also the author of the book, The Violent Universe: Joyrides Through the X-Ray Cosmos, published by Johns Hopkins University Press.

Personal life
Weaver enjoys music, art, and singing. She also loves community theatre, where she participates in acting, directing and set design. She especially likes playing the part of Elvira in Noël Coward's Blithe Spirit. While in college she was a member of the WVU marching band and in 1986 was elected Miss Mountaineer. Weaver has a particular interest in involving children with astronomy. Her parents, Kenna (deceased in 2010) and Patricia Weaver, still reside in Morgantown, West Virginia.

References

External links
 Kim Weaver personal website

American women astronomers
1964 births
Living people
People from Morgantown, West Virginia
Scientists from West Virginia
West Virginia University alumni
University of Maryland, College Park alumni
NASA people
NASA astrophysicists
Educators from West Virginia
American women educators
Writers from West Virginia
American science writers
21st-century American women